Hadiyya (speakers call it Hadiyyisa, others sometimes call it Hadiyigna, Adiya, Adea, Adiye, Hadia, Hadiya, Hadya) is the language of the Hadiya people of Ethiopia. It is a Highland East Cushitic language of the Afroasiatic family. Most speakers live in the Hadiya Zone of the Southern Nations, Nationalities, and People's Region (SNNPR).

The closely related Libido language, located just to the north in the Mareko district of Gurage Zone, is very similar lexically, but has significant morphological differences. Hadiyya has a set of complex consonant phonemes consisting of a glottal stop and a sonorant: .

In their book (English version 1999) Braukämper and Mishago compiled a reasonable size collection of the presently vanishing art of traditional songs of Hadiyya. The lyrics adhere to the strict rule of Hadiyya traditional poetry where rhythmical rhyming occurs at the beginning of the verse.

The New Testament of the Christian Bible has been translated into Hadiyya, published by the Bible Society of Ethiopia in 1993. It was originally done using the traditional Ethiopic syllabary. A later printing used the Latin alphabet.

Orthography

Notes

References 
 Korhonen, Elsa, Mirja Saksa, and Ronald J. Sim. 1986. "A dialect study of Kambaata-Hadiyya (Ethiopia) [part 1]."  Afrikanistische Arbeitspapiere 5: 5-41.
 Korhonen, Elsa, Mirja Saksa, and Ronald J. Sim. 1986. "A dialect study of Kambaata-Hadiyya (Ethiopia), part 2: Appendices."  Afrikanistische Arbeitspapiere 6: 71-121.
 Leslau, Wolf. 1985. The liquid l in Hadiyya and West Gurage. Mélanges linguistiques offerts à Maxime Rodinson (Comptes rendus du groupe linguistique d’études chamito-sémitiques supplément 12), 231-238. Paris: Librairie Orientaliste Paul Geuthner.
 Perrett, Denise Lesley. 1993. The switch-reference phenomena in Hadiyya: A labelled deductive system perspective, M.A. thesis, Univ. of London.
 Perrett, Denise Lesley. 2000. The dynamics of tense construal in Hadiyya, Ph.D. dissertation, Univ. of London.
 Plazikowsky-Brauner, Herma. 1960. Die Hadiya-Sprache. Rassegna di Studi Etiopici 16.38-76.
 Plazikowsky-Brauner, Herma. 1961. Texte der Hadiya-Sprache. Rassegna di Studi Etiopici 17.83-115.
 Plazikowsky-Brauner, Herma. 1964. Wörterbuch der Hadiya-Sprache. Rassegna di Studi Etiopici 20.133-182.
 Sim, Ronald J. 1985. "The morphological structure of some main verb forms in Hadiyya."  In The verb morphophonemics of five highland east Cushitic languages, including Burji, 10-43. Afrikanistische Arbeitspapiere, 2. Cologne: Institut für Afrikanistik.
 Sim, Ronald J. 1988. "Violations of the two-consonant constraint in Hadiyya."  African Languages and Cultures 1: 77-90.
 Sim, Ronald J. 1989. Predicate conjoining in Hadiyya: a head-driven PS grammar.  Ph.D. thesis. University of Edinburgh.
 Stinson, D. Lloyd. 1976. Hadiyya. In Language in Ethiopia, M. L. Bender et al., eds., 148-154. London: Oxford University Press.
 Tadese Sibamo Garkebo. 2015. Documentation and Description of Hadiyya. Addis Ababa University doctoral dissertation. Web access

East Cushitic languages
Languages of Ethiopia
Subject–object–verb languages
Cushitic-speaking peoples